The Annobon leaf-toed gecko (Hemidactylus aporus) is a species of geckos in the family Gekkonidae. It is only known from the island of Annobón, Equatorial Guinea. The species was described and named by George Albert Boulenger in 1906 based on several specimens collected by Leonardo Fea between sea level and 500 metres elevation.

References

External links

aporus
Endemic fauna of Annobón
Reptiles of Equatorial Guinea
Reptiles described in 1906
Taxa named by George Albert Boulenger